The Leicester Tramways Company operated a horse-drawn tramway service in Leicester from 1874 to 1901.

History
The Leicester Tramways Company was incorporated under the Tramways Act, 1870 in 1872 with power to raise capital of £40,000. The company employed the well-regarded engineer Joseph Kincaid and entered into an agreement with William Turton to construct the tramways at a cost of £32,500.

Construction was slower than expected and once the directors had received 3 of their cars, a trial trip was carried out on the first line on 23 December 1874 from the Clock Tower to the Folly Inn in Belgrave. Public services started the following day, 24 December 1874 with a flat fare of 2d. 

The line to Humberstone opened on 22 March 1875 and the London Road section was opened on 13 August 1875. This completed the network that the company was originally authorised to construct. 

In 1876 the company attempted a trial of a Hughes steam locomotive built at the Falcon works at Loughborough. However, the company did not progress with this beyond the trial and retained horse power for the rest of the life of the company.

In 1878 there were further extensions of the Victoria Park line for 1 mile along London Road to Knighton Lane, and new arterial routes along Welford Road and Aylestone Road to Grace Road on 7 June 1878, and along Church Gate, Sanvey Gate and Woodgate to Groby Road on 20 August 1878. 

The company was purchased on 31 December 1901 by Leicester Corporation for the sum of £134,110 and they set up Leicester Corporation Tramways to electrify and extend the system.

References

Tram transport in England
Transport in Leicestershire
Companies based in Leicester